John Woodburn may refer to:

Sir John Woodburn (civil servant) (1843–1902), British civil servant in India
John Woodburn (cyclist) (1937–2017), British road and time-trial cyclist
John Woodburn (footballer), Scottish footballer